Basanta may refer to

Basanta Choudhury, Indian actor
Basanta Regmi, Nepalese cricketer.
Basanta Singh, Indian footballer
Basanta Utsav (film), 2013 Bengali film
Basanta Mullick, Indian Judge
Basanta Kumar Biswas, Indian independence activist.
Basanta Kumar Das (disambiguation)
Basanta Bahadur Rana, Indian athlete
Basanta Kumar Nemwang, Nepalese politician.
José María Basanta, Argentine footballer.